Miguel Ángel Ramón Samudio (born 24 August 1986) is a Paraguayan footballer.

Career
In 2014, he signed for Cruzeiro on a one-year loan contract expiring at the end of 2014 with his playing rights set at an undisclosed fee.

International career

He made his international debut in 2009. He played in the qualifying games for the 2014 World Cup.

Sol de America 
Miguel Samudio started Club Sol de América in 2006, where he played 27 games and scored 2 goals. After spending two seasons with the Sol de América, he moved to Club Libertad.

Libertad 
In 2008 it was announced that Miguel Samudio signed with Club Libertad. Where he plays until December 2013.

Cruzeiro 
On 13 December 2013 the Cruzeiro team announced the signing of the left back.

Club America 
Subsequently, on 15 December 2014, his transfer for US$2 million and 4 years to Club América of Liga MX was confirmed, which he would join upon ending his participation with Cruzeiro.

Queretaro 
On 13 December 2017, his arrival is confirmed by the Querétaro team as a reinforcement as a definitive purchase.

Club Olimpia 
En julio de 2019 es anunciado como nuevo jugador del Club Olimpia de Paraguay. Debido a la falta de acuerdo para la renovación de su contrato que vencía el 30 de junio del 2020, termina su vínculo con el Decano.

Return to Sol of America 
After 12 years, he returns to the club that saw him born to play the 2020 Clausura Tournament and the 2020 South American Cup.

Honours
Libertad
Paraguayan Primera División: 2008 Clausura, 2010

Cruzeiro
Campeonato Mineiro: 2014
Campeonato Brasileiro Série A: 2014

América
CONCACAF Champions League: 2014–15, 2015–16

Olimpia
Paraguayan Primera Division: 2019 Apertura, 2019 Clausura

References

External links 
 
 

1986 births
Living people
People from Capiatá
Paraguayan footballers
Paraguayan expatriate footballers
Association football defenders
Club Sol de América footballers
Club Libertad footballers
Cruzeiro Esporte Clube players
Club América footballers
Querétaro F.C. footballers
Club Olimpia footballers
Paraguay international footballers
Paraguayan Primera División players
Campeonato Brasileiro Série A players
Liga MX players
Expatriate footballers in Brazil
Expatriate footballers in Mexico
Paraguayan expatriate sportspeople in Brazil
Paraguayan expatriate sportspeople in Mexico
2015 Copa América players
Copa América Centenario players